North Twin Island is an uninhabited Arctic island located east of Akimiski Island in James Bay on the southern end of Hudson Bay. The smaller, similarly shaped, South Twin Island is located approximately 10 km southeast. Together, they are known as the Twin Islands, and are part of the Qikiqtaaluk Region of the Canadian territory of Nunavut.

It is an important breeding site for Canada Geese and Semipalmated Plovers. It is also home to resident willow ptarmigans and Arctic terns.

References

 Sea islands: Atlas of Canada; Natural Resources Canada

Islands of James Bay
Uninhabited islands of Qikiqtaaluk Region